Manuel García-Moran (born 17 February 1935) is a Spanish alpine skier. He competed in three events at the 1960 Winter Olympics.

References

1935 births
Living people
Spanish male alpine skiers
Olympic alpine skiers of Spain
Alpine skiers at the 1960 Winter Olympics
20th-century Spanish people